Mandelbaum is a Jewish (Ashkenazic) surname from the German Mandelbaum ‘almond tree’. Notable people with the surname include:

Albert Mandelbaum (1925–unknown), Israeli chess player
Allen Mandelbaum (1926–2011), American professor of Italian literature, poet, and translator
David G. Mandelbaum (1911–1987), American anthropologist
Fredericka Mandelbaum (1825–1894), New York entrepreneur and criminal fence operator
Frederic Morton (born Fritz Mandelbaum) (1924–2015), Austrian writer
Henryk Mandelbaum (1922–2008), Holocaust survivor
Jacques Mandelbaum (born 1958), French journalist and film critic
Joel Mandelbaum (born 1932), microtonal musician
Ken Mandelbaum, American columnist, critic, and author
Kurt Mandelbaum (1904–1995), development economist
Michael Mandelbaum (born 1946), professor of American foreign policy
Samuel Mandelbaum (1884–1946), American lawyer and politician

Fictional characters
Izzy Mandelbaum, character on Seinfeld
Mandelbaum (aka Mandel), assistant district attorney for Manhattan in the Nero Wolfe books

See also
Mandelbaum Gate, Jerusalem
The Mandelbaum Gate, a 1965 novel by Muriel Spark
Mandelbaum Effect, the tendency for people to focus nearby in conditions of poor visibility

References

Jewish surnames

Surnames from ornamental names